Jacforus cavatus is a species of crab in the monotypic genus Jacforus in the family Xanthidae.

Description 

Distribution 
Jacforus cavatus has a wide distribution in the tropical Indo-Pacific, ranging from Kenya to Australia, Japan and Hawaii.

Taxonomy 
J. cavatus was first described by Mary J. Rathbun in 1907 as Cycloxanthus cavatus. It was described again by Charles Howard Edmondson in 1925 as Euxanthus minutus, and again by Edmondson in 1931 as Megametope sulcatus, both of which are junior subjective (heterotypic) synonyms. The affinites of Rathbun's species with other genera have also been unclear; its apparent affinities with the genus Medaeus are superficial. When Danièle Guinot split the genus Cycloxanthops in 1968, creating the new genus Neoxanthops, C. cavatus was not explicitly placed in either genus. A new genus, Jacforus, was erected in 2003, commemorating Jacques Forest, and containing only J. cavatus.

References

External links 
 Jacforus cavatus, Marine Invertebrates of Kalaupapa National Historical Park

Xanthoidea
Crustaceans described in 1907
Monotypic crustacean genera